Pelasgia (land of the Pelasgians) in historical geography may be an earlier toponym of
 

Greece (Hellas)
Arcadia
the Peloponnese
Larissa Cremaste a city in Phthiotis, southern Thessaly, where the historical Pelasgiotis district existed.

See also
Pelasgus

References

Ancient Greek geography
Pelasgians
Names of places in Greece